Maratha occupation of Kolistan in the year 1672 was a campaign in which the Maratha army under Shivaji and his  son Sambhaji and Peshwa Moropant defeated the allied forces of Koli kings of Jawhar and Ramnagar Mughal Empire and the British Troops. The Marathas captured the region called Kolistan encompassing the Jawhar, Mokhada, Wada, Talasari, Vikramgad talukas in present day Palghar district of Maharashtra and the regions Southern Gujarat controlled by the Koli king of Ramnagar.

Background 
Shivaji had sacked the city of Surat in the year 1664. He passed through the territories of Koli Kings of Jawhar and Ramnagar and they had helped him. The Treaty of Purandar was signed between Marathas and the Mughals in the year 1665. After the treaty the Koli Kings became vassals of the Mughal Empire. When Shivaji sacked Surat for a second time in the year 1670, the Koli Kings did not help him. Hence Shivaji wanted to capture the crucial territories of Kolistan which lied just to the South of Surat. While the first and second sack of surat Shivaji harmed and looted the British officers and their camps. Thus, the british  officers wanted to avenge Shivaji, they helped Koli kings of Jawahar and koli kings of Ramnagar. Capturing Kolistan would have given Shivaji an access to the Mughal province of Gujarat. Shivaji, his son Sambhaji and Peshwa Moropant Pingle arrived to capture Kolistan from the Koli Kings and Mughal empire. Allied forces of Koli state of Jawhar,Koli state of Ramnagar and the british officers with Mughal General Dilir Khan confronted Marathas in kolistan region. This was the first crucial military campaign in the life of Sambhaji.

Campaign of the Marathas 
Shivaji, Sambhaji and Moropant left the capital with a force of 7,000 men. The Marathas controlled regions as far as Mahuli fort in Thane district hence they attacked Kolistan from the south. Sambhaji led the Maratha forces and attacked Koli king Vikramshah's capital city of Jawhar. Vikramshah and the british officers  which helped him fled the city without fighting. They  fled to senior Mughal Sardar Dilir Khan who was stationed at Nashik with a large army. Rest of the soldiers in Vikramshah's army were assimilated into the Maratha army. The Marathas then attacked the Koli state of Ramnagar in southern Gujarat and captured the city. The Koli king of Ramnagar Som Shah also fled without offering any resistance to invading Maratha army. Marathas had stretched their territories up to 10 miles south of Surat which was highly unaffordable for the Mughals. Hence Diler Khan decided to help the Koli Kings and the british officers to capture the region once again.

Battle of Vikramgad 

Shivaji was resting at jawhar, and his son Sambhaji with Peshwa  Moropant Pingle stayed at Vikramgad. Diler Khan immediately with  his General Khizr Khan with an army about 10,000 immediately arrived to capture Kolistan back from the Marathas.Dilir Khan and  Khizr Khan decided to attack the Marathas led by Sambhaji in a full fledged battle. The two forces clashed near the town of Vikramgad.The battle began with initial skirmishes which were inconclusive. Both the forces clashed with other and a fierce battle went on 2-3 hours. Both sides had heavy casualties but battle was still inconclusive till afternoon. Then the Marathas started to gain an upper hand in the battle, inflicting very heavy casualties on the Mughal army. Khizr Khan was himself wounded in the severe battle. Seeing this the Mughal army started to flee towards Nashik. The Marathas routed the fleeing Mughal army. Victory in the battle of Vikramgad further consolidated the Maratha hold on Kolistan.

Aftermath 
The Maratha occupation of Kolistan gave them access to the province of Gujarat. The Marathas extended their border to ten miles south of Surat, threatening the Mughal trading center of Surat. Shivaji then constructed two new forts namely Parner and Pindwol in Kolistan to strengthen his control over the region.

Legacy 
This was the first campaign led by a 15-year-old prince Sambhaji. His success in his first campaign as a military leader enhanced his reputation among the other regional powers.

See also 
 List of Koli people
 List of Koli states and clans

References 

Kolistan
Kolistan